Her Bright Skies is a Swedish pop punk band based in Jönköping.

History 
HBS consists of Johan "Jaybee" Brolin (vocals), Niclas "Nikki" Sjostedt (guitar), Petter "Pete" Nilsson (guitar, vocals), Jonas Guddmunson (drums), and Joakim "Jolly" Karlsson (bass guitar, vocals). The first CD was released in 2007 and is called Beside Quiet Waters. The EP was produced on their own.

Just one year later their debut full-length album called A Sacrament; Ill City followed. The album was produced at District 19 Records. Their second full-length CD is called Causing a Scene and was produced at Swedish Independent record label Panic & Action. Causing a Scene was released in 2010. The same year HBS played at Pier Pressure Festival together with Thirty Seconds to Mars, HIM, Pendulum and Paramore. The Used cancelled their gig at Pier Pressure. The band shared stage with Swedish Metalcore band and label mates Adept through Germany and with Bring Me the Horizon through Scandinavia.

HBS co-headlined Panic & Action Tour with Kid Down through Sweden. The band played concerts in Germany, Norway, Austria and the Netherlands.

In June 2011 HBS shared stage at Siesta Festivalen together with Asking Alexandria, ...And You Will Know Us by the Trail of Dead, August Burns Red, Adept, Bullet and many other bands.

They finished their second tour in the United States, and released their third album Rivals.

The band broke up in 2016 and played their last concert on March 26. However, they returned four years later as a quartet and with a new single, "Bored", released on March 20, 2020.

Discography

EPs 
 2006: Her Bright Skies
 2007: Beside Quiet Waters
 2012: DJ Got Us Falling In Love (Panic & Action, half acoustic EP)
 2015: Prodigal Son

Albums 
 2008: A Sacrament; Ill City (District 19)
 2010: Causing A Scene (Panic & Action)
 2012: Rivals (Panic & Action)

Singles 
 2010: "Little Miss Obvious" (Panic & Action)
 2011: "Ghosts Of the Attic" (Panic & Action)
 2012: "Lovekills" (Panic & Action)
 2014: "Bonnie & Clyde" (Panic & Action)
 2020: "Bored"

Music videos
 2006: Synapse Year
 2008: Burn All the Small Towns
 2010: Sing It!
 2010: Little Miss Obvious
 2011: Ghosts of the Attic
 2012: DJ Got Us Fallin' In Love (Usher Cover)
 2012: Lovekills
 2013: Rivals
 2014: Bonnie & Clyde (The Revolution)
 2014: Hurt (NIN cover)
 2020: Bored

References

External links 
 Official homepage

Musical groups established in 2005
Swedish musical groups
Pop punk groups
Post-hardcore groups
Jönköping